Sikiru Olatunbosun (born 3 January 1996) is a Nigerian footballer who plays as a winger for Turkish club Tuzlaspor.

Career

2016 season
On 15 June 2016, Olatunbosun scored a brace against Nasarawa United at the Agege Stadium which earned him praise. In August 2016 Olatunbosun scored another brace as MFM beat Akwa United 3–0. Olatunbosun latter claimed that he knew he was going to score a brace against Akwa United because the match was on his birthday and he felt he had been empowered by God. Olatunbosun finished the season with 7 goals.

2017 season
In the first match of the 2017 season Olatunbosun scored his team's first goal of the season against Niger Tornadoes at the Agege stadium in an eventual 3–0 win. Afterwards Olatunbosun stated that he would be targeting the season's top scorer award.

Goal against Enugu Rangers

On 24 February 2017 in a match against defending champions Enugu Rangers Olatunbosun took down a back-heel flick from teammate Stephen Odey and then improvised with a flick of his own over with his right foot over Rangers defender Emmanuel Etim and although off balance managed to hit an unstoppable left-footed volley into the top corner. The match ended with MFM prevailing 2–1 but Olatunbosun's goal gained widespread attention over the internet and was nominated for the CNN goal of the week award. Only one Nigerian (Kelechi Iheanacho) had ever won the award before for a goal in an international match against Tanzania and no Nigerian Premier League player had ever even been nominated for the award. On 4 March, it was announced that Olatunbosun's goal had indeed won the CNN award gathering more than 80 percent of the vote. Afterwards, Olatunbosun's strike was also widely totted as worthy of the Puskas Award and mentions of it were published in Spanish, Brazilian, French, Italian, and British newspapers. Olatunbosun said afterwards that the goal was because of the grace of God, adding that he hoped that MFM F.C. would qualify for Africa's continental championship at the end of the season.

Plateau United
In December 2018, Olatunbosun joined Plateau United.

Menemenspor
On 21 August 2019, Olatunbosun joined Turkish club Menemenspor on a two-year contract.

International career
Olatunbosun was called up as part of a Nigeria XI for the 2014 Expo Unity World Cup, where he scored two goals in the final, a 7-0 thrashing of a Colombia XI.
He first represented the full Nigeria national football team in June 2017, coming on as a sub in a friendly against Togo.

Personal life
Olatunbosun was born in Lagos. In his youth Olatunbosun was also a talented baseball player and was part of the local team at Finbas College. He played in baseball tournaments in Burkina Faso and other African countries as well as the national tournament in Abuja before permanently switching to football.

References

External links
 
 
 

1996 births
Sportspeople from Lagos
Living people
Nigerian footballers
Nigeria international footballers
Association football forwards
MFM F.C. players
Plateau United F.C. players
Menemenspor footballers
Ankaraspor footballers
Smouha SC players
Rivers United F.C. players
Tuzlaspor players
Nigeria Professional Football League players
TFF First League players
Egyptian Premier League players
Nigerian expatriate footballers
Nigerian expatriate sportspeople in Turkey
Expatriate footballers in Turkey
Nigerian expatriate sportspeople in Egypt
Expatriate footballers in Egypt